The women's 500 metres in speed skating at the 1968 Winter Olympics took place on 9 February, at the L'Anneau de Vitesse.

Records
Prior to this competition, the existing world and Olympic records were as follows:

Results

References

Women's speed skating at the 1968 Winter Olympics
Olymp
Skat